Mount Vaughan is a prominent peak, 3,140 m, standing 4 miles (6 km) south-southwest of Mount Griffith on the ridge at the head of Vaughan Glacier, in the Hays Mountains of the Queen Maud Mountains. Named for Norman D. Vaughan, dog driver with the Byrd Antarctic Expedition geological party under Laurence M. Gould which explored the mountains in this vicinity in December 1929. The map resulting from the Byrd Antarctic Expedition, 1928–30, applied the name Mount Vaughan to the southern portion of Mount Goodale, but the Advisory Committee on Antarctic Names (US-ACAN) has modified the original naming to apply to this larger peak which lies 15 miles (24 km) southeastward.

Vaughan made the first step on the mountain in 1994 December 16, three days before his 89th birthday.

References

External links 
 http://www.normanvaughan.com/mountain.html

Mountains of the Ross Dependency
Queen Maud Mountains
Amundsen Coast